Salt Creek Earth Station is a satellite ground station located approximately  southwest of Arbuckle, California. It is licensed to Xaba Ranch, LLC, a real estate holding company. The site was formerly licensed to AT&T, for whom it carried much of the United States' telecommunications to Asia and the Pacific Rim. According to James Bamford, the National Security Agency uses the facility to capture and monitor satellite telecommunications traveling in and out of the United States.

References

National Security Agency facilities
Earth stations in the United States
Buildings and structures in Colusa County, California
1990 establishments in California